A backdoor cold front, or backdoor front, is a cold front moving south or southwest along the northeast of the Atlantic seaboard in North America, particularly in the Northeastern United States and the Great Lakes. Typically occurring in spring, the front drives cool Atlantic air from the east or northeast into northeastern US that supersedes the warmer continental air. The front is termed "backdoor" because it arrives from the east, meaning it originates from the opposite direction of a typical cold front and therefore comes through the region's "back door."

Formation
A backdoor cold front occurs when the clockwise motion around a high pressure system pulls in colder air toward the south and west of it. This is where a synoptic wind motion creates a wind flow from the cool North Atlantic Ocean that brings in the backdoor front. A cold front, however, approaches from the north, northwest or west, and its wind direction will generally be from those directions (since most weather moves west to east), except this does not happen with a backdoor cold front. Rather, a back door cold front arrives from a particular direction, where it will move in an opposite direction, unlike a regular cold front.

In spring, the Atlantic is still very chilly, and hence the air above it is also cold. That air can move to northeastern US if a large high pressure area is anchored in the Canadian Maritimes or the northern states. The high pressure system's clockwise flow directs cold moist air southward and westward into Northeast US. The area where these two airmasses collide is illustrated by the frontal boundary in Northern New England (near the Gulf of Maine) and northern New Jersey. Low clouds develop along and behind the front. As a backdoor cold front withdraws, temperatures can rise rapidly.

Characteristics

Backdoor fronts would point toward the southeast direction, but they can alter, such as an east–west emplacement or may move towards the northeast if the cold front is encircling a subtropical cyclone. The leading boundary of this cold air forms a cold front, which is typically represented on surface analysis charts as a front aligned roughly east-west. The backdoor cold front may move towards the southwest or west.

They are mostly shallow, with much of the maritime air only reaching a few thousand feet aboveground and thus would rarely pass the Appalachian Mountains. The clouds associated with the backdoor cold front stretch from southern Illinois to North Carolina. Low clouds develop along and behind the front because such the front's winds usually come from the ocean, in addition to scattered showers, although the precipitation is mist and drizzle. Its effects may last a few hours or a couple of days, depending on the system.

Backdoor fronts are generally welcomed, particularly on a hot summer day, when humid air from the Gulf of Mexico has engulfed the eastern United States. When a backdoor front pushes the warm, convective flow back to the South, the outcome is purer skies, lower temperatures and less humidity.

Areas affected
Back door cold fronts are common from New England to Virginia, due to cold Atlantic water lingering near the coast. They impact Boston, New York City, the Jersey shore, and New England, though they at times may reach as far inland as Philadelphia, Baltimore and Washington DC. The warm Gulf Stream prevents the cool onshore flow of the front, so states below North Carolina are shielded.

Notable example
On 27 May 2014, Boston struggled to reach , when it was  two days earlier.

See also
Southerly buster
Fremantle Doctor
Cape Doctor

References

Winds
Climate of the United States
Weather events in the United States
Atlantic Ocean
Northeastern United States
Weather fronts
Cold
Climate of Massachusetts